Reject the Sickness is the first full-length studio album by the New Jersey heavy metal quintet God Forbid. It was recorded at Trax East Studios in South River, New Jersey, and produced, mixed and engineered by Steve Evetts. Cover art was painted by Matt Kimball. It was re-released in 2001 on We Put Out Records. God Forbid owns the master tapes and thus was able to release it themselves outside of their deal with Century Media Records.

Track listing

Personnel
 Byron Davis – lead vocals
 Doc Coyle – lead guitar
 Dallas Coyle – rhythm guitar
 John "Beeker" Outcalt – bass guitar
 Corey Pierce – drums

1999 debut albums
God Forbid albums
Albums produced by Steve Evetts